Camille Mildred Mather (March 16, 1912 – September 30, 2008) was a nurse and political figure. She represented Delta in the Legislative Assembly of British Columbia from 1960 to 1963 as a Co-operative Commonwealth Federation (CCF) member.

Born Camille Mildred Swanson in Victoria, she studied nursing at Royal Columbian Hospital in New Westminster and took additional training in psychiatry. She married Barry Mather. Mather served as a municipal councillor for Burnaby City Council during the 1950s; she also was a director for Burnaby General Hospital and a member of the Metropolitan Health Board. She was defeated when she ran for reelection to the provincial assembly in 1963. Mather was active in the campaign against nuclear testing. She died in Surrey, British Columbia in 2008.

References 

1912 births
2008 deaths
British Columbia Co-operative Commonwealth Federation MLAs
20th-century Canadian politicians
Burnaby city councillors
Politicians from Victoria, British Columbia
Women MLAs in British Columbia
20th-century Canadian women politicians